The Claus Family is a 2020 Dutch-Belgian film directed by Matthias Temmermans, written by Matthias Temmermans and Ruben Vandenborre and starring Jan Decleir, Mo Bakker and Stefaan Degand.

Plot
Suzanne moves with her children Jules and Noor from The Netherlands to Belgium as she found work in a Belgian biscuit factory. During her work hours, Noël - her father in law - takes care of the children. By coincidence Jules finds in his grandfathers possessions a magical snow globe which can transfer him to any place in the world. He also discovers his grandfather is the real Santa Claus. Noël has a secret working place at some snowy place where he gets help from some elves. Noël gets health issues and is no longer able to deliver the Christmas presents over the world so Jules is forced to help him. However, Jules hates Christmas as his father died the previous year on Christmas eve and is not eager to help. This gets worse after he finds out Santa Claus does not live forever and all eldest sons in his family tree are ought to take over to role of Santa Claus once the predecessor dies or got too old. At same time, the biscuit factory is about to go bankrupt as management does not want to invest in new tastes.

Cast 
 Jan Decleir as Noël Claus
 Mo Bakker as Jules Claus
 Stefaan Degand as Holger
 Eva van der Gucht as Gunna
 Bracha van Doesburgh as Suzanne / Mama
 Sien Eggers as Het
 Josje Huisman as Ikka
 Renée Soutendijk as Oma
 Pommelien Thijs as Ella
 Wim Willaert as Stef
 Rashif El Kaoui as Farid
 Tom De Beckker as Inbreker
 Mieke De Groote as Dokter
 Janne Desmet as Assa
 Amber Metdepenningen as Norah

Production
The movie is produced by Kinepolis Film Distribution and it was the intention to release it on 25 November 2020 in Kinepolis-theatres. However, due to COVID-19 Belgian theatres were closed. Netflix was interested in the movie and got exclusive distribution rights. The movie is available on Netflix as from 7 December 2020.

References

External links
 
 

2020 films
Dutch children's films
2020s Dutch-language films
Santa Claus in film